Chaim Ozer Grodzinski (August 24, 1863 – August 9, 1940) was a Av beis din (rabbinical chief justice), posek (halakhic authority), and Talmudic scholar in Vilnius, Lithuania in the late 19th and early 20th centuriesfor over 55 years. He played an instrumental role in preserving Lithuanian yeshivas during the Communist era, and Polish and Russian yeshivas of Poland and during the Nazi invasion of Poland in 1939, when he arranged for these yeshivas to relocate to Lithuanian cities.

Biography
Chaim Ozer Grodzinski was born on 9 Elul 5623 (24 August 1863) in Iwye, Belarus, a small town near Vilnius. His father, David Shlomo Grodzinski, was rabbi of Iwye for over 40 years, and his grandfather was rabbi of the town for 40 years before that.

When he was 12 years old he went to study with the perushim, a group of Lithuanian Torah scholars in Eishyshok where he became bar mitzvah.

At the age of 15, he began studying at the Volozhin yeshiva and was accepted into Chaim Soloveitchik's shiur. He was married in his early twenties.

Two years after his marriage, Grodzinski's father-in-law, Eliyahu Eliezer Grodnenski died and Grodnenski replaced him as a rabbi in Vilnius.

Leadership
In 1887 he was appointed as a dayan (religious judge) of the beth din of Vilna. He was a participant in the founding conference of Agudath Israel (in Kattowitz, Silesia, in 1912) and served on the party's Council of Sages. He also was a co-founder and active leader of the Va'ad ha-Yeshivot (Council of the Yeshivot), based in Vilnius, an umbrella organization that offered material and spiritual support for yeshivot throughout the eastern provinces of Poland from 1924 to 1939. He wrote a three-volume work Achiezer.

He assisted in the management of the Rameilles Yeshiva of Vilnius. His students included Yehezkel Abramsky, Eliezer Silver, Moshe Shatzkes, and Reuven Katz.

In 1909, there was a meeting in Hamburg, Germany, that was the precursor of Agudas Yisroel, whose main goal was to combat the Zionists and the Mizrachi against Zionism. Grodzinski was the first chairman of the Moetzes Gedolei Torah, the rabbinical advisory board to the Agudah.

Death
Grodzinski died of cancer on 9 August 1940 (5 Av 5700).

References

1863 births
1940 deaths
People from Iwye
Belarusian Haredi rabbis
Lithuanian Haredi rabbis
19th-century Lithuanian rabbis
20th-century Lithuanian rabbis
Anti-Zionist Haredi rabbis
Deaths from cancer in Lithuania
Rabbis from Vilnius